Diana Staehly (born 31 October 1977) is a German actress.

Education
Staehly's training began in 1997, when she first took private acting lessons. In 2000 she was trained at the Hollywood Acting Workshop in Cologne. She moved to New York City in 2001 and studied at the Lee Strasberg Theatre and Film Institute. From 2002 to 2006, she studied media and cultural studies.

Career
Through her hobby, Staehly came to work-routed RTL soap opera Unter uns, when the casting agency for the series was looking for a talented actress. From 1997 to 2000, she played the role of Susanne "Sue" Sommerfeld in the series. In 2002, she took on a role in the series Alarm für Cobra 11 – Die Autobahnpolizei. From 2001 to 2006, she had a role in the series Die Anrheiner. From 2004 to 2012, she appeared in the comedy series Stromberg as Tanja Steinke (née Seifert) and in 2014 in the film Stromberg – The Movie. From 2007 to 2015, she played in the ZDF series Die Rosenheim-Cops with the role of financial controller Patrizia Ortmann. In January 2012, she played in the ZDF series Die Bergretter in the episode "Gold Rush" the highly pregnant Sophie Zeidler. From September 2016, Staehly was seen as the new main commissioner Anna Maiwald in the ZDF series Cologne P.D., succeeding Christina Plate. The shooting of the consequences of the 13th season began in January 2016 in Cologne. In addition, from 2017 on, she plays the lead actress Anna in Triple Ex.

Staehly made her film debut in the German comedy  (2007) alongside of Florian Lukas and Sebastian Bezzel.

Personal life
Since 2007, Staehly is married to the director René Wolter, with whom she has a daughter (b. 2012).

Filmography 
 1997-2000: Unter uns (TV series, 23 episodes)
 2000: Beauties
 2001-2006: Die Anrheiner (TV series, 54 episodes)
 2002-2014: Alarm für Cobra 11 - Die Autobahnpolizei (TV series, 3 episodes)
 2003: Wilsberg (TV series)
 2004: Verschollen
 2004: König von Kreuzberg (TV series, 7 episodes)
 2004-2012: Stromberg (TV series, 46 episodes)
 2005: Cologne P.D.
 2006: Forsthaus Falkenau - Entscheidung in der Savanne
 2006: Inga Lindström - Sommertage am Lilja-See (TV film)
 2006: Rosamunde Pilcher - Sommer der Liebe (TV film)
 2007: 
 2007: Unter anderen Umständen: Bis dass der Tod euch scheidet
 2007-2016: Die Rosenheim-Cops (TV series, 247 Episodes)
 2012: Die Bergretter - Goldrausch
 2012: Der letzte Bulle - Aller guten Dinge sind drei
 2012: Die Tote ohne Alibi (TV film)
 2014: Stromberg - Der Film
 2015: Hanna Hellmann (TV miniseries, 2 episodes)
 2015: Mein gebrauchter Mann (TV film)
 2016: Bettys Diagnose - Turteln und Zwitschern
 2016: Stuttgart Homicide - Dirty Harry
 since 2016: Cologne P.D.  (TV series, 25 episodes)
 2017: Triple Ex (TV series)

References

External links 
 Official Website
 

1977 births
Living people
Actors from Cologne
German film actresses
German television actresses
20th-century German actresses
21st-century German actresses